The 2021–22 Turkcell Women's Football Super League  is the 26th season of Turkey's premier women's football league. The league was formerly called the Turkish Women's First Football League and was renamed to Turkscell Women's Football League the previous year.

The league consists of 24 teams with addition of eight newly established women's football sides of major Süper Lig clubs to the former 16 teams of the 2020–21 Turkcell Women's Football League. Promoted eight teams are Altay, Çaykur Rizespor, Fatih Karagümrük, Fenerbahçe, Galatasaray, Hatayspor, Sivassspor and Trabzonspor. 

The matches will be played in two groups of each 12 teams. The league starts on 18 December 2021 and ends on 4 May 2022, having a half-season break between 13 and 24 February 2022. Following the regular season, four leading teams of each group will play play-off matches. The league champion will represent Turkey at the 2022–23 UEFA Women's Champions League. The last four teams of the two groups will play-out matches, and the losing four teams will be relegated to the Turkish Women's Second Football League. Play-off and play-out matches will take place between 12 May and 11 June 2022.

Domestic players born before 31 December 2005 are eligible only. Teams are permitted to have up to six foreign players.

Teams

Team changes

Qualifying stage

Group A

Group B

Knockout stage

Play–outs

|}

Relegated teams
 İlkadım Belediye YabPa Spor
 Kayserispor
 Kocaeli Bayan FK
 Sivasspor

Play–offs
Quarterfinals

|}

Semifinals

|}
Final

Top goalscorers
.

Hat-tricks and more

Gallery

References

2021
2021–22 domestic women's association football leagues
Women's First League